One and One Is One is the debut studio album by English dance music group Joi, released on 23 February 1999 by Real World Records.

Background and composition
One and One Is One takes its title from a metaphysical Bengali poem. The album mixes the Farook and Haroon Shamsher's club interests with their regard for ancestral folk roots. It fuses drum and bass, techno, breakbeats and hip hop with traditional Asian. sounds of sitar, flutes and tablas.

Critical response

Rick Anderson of AllMusic rated One and One Is One 3/5 and said, "...nothing on this album is less than pleasant, but too, not much of it is more than just pleasant." Jane Cornwell of The Independent said, "As with their live work, the album has been crafted to take the listener on a journey." Indian Electronica rated the album 5/5 and said, "Titillating dabs and flourishes of tabla and sitar throughout the album seamlessly help construct Without Zero as a perfectly balanced aural landscape - naturally appealing to mind, feet and heart."

Tad Hendrickson of CMJ New Music Report said of the album, "The auspicious, skillfully executed debut presents even more possibilities to the expanding genre of raga groove." Sarah Pratt of CMJ New Music Monthly thought "Joi's distinctive sound is most compelling..."

Track listing

Personnel
Musicians
 Vik Sharma – guitar
 Rupert Eugster – flute
 Bongo Paul – percussion

Vocals
 Susheela Raman

Awards

References

External links

1999 debut albums
Bengali-language albums
Hindi-language albums
Real World Records albums
Joi (band) albums